Liu Shiwen (born 12 April 1991) is a Chinese table tennis player. She is a five-time World Cup champion, one-time World Champion, three-time ITTF World Tour Grand Finals champion and four-time Asian Cup champion. She is known to be one of the fastest players in the world.

She held the ITTF No. 1 rank for nine consecutive months from January to September 2010, thirteen consecutive months during 2013–2014, and eleven consecutive months during 2015–2016. Also, she has been consistently ranked first or second in ITTF Women's World ranking from early 2012 to mid-2017 (with no lower rank than third).

Equipment
Liu Shiwen currently uses a Custom made Butterfly ZLC with a black DHS Hurricane 3 NEO Blue Sponge (2.1mm,39.5°) for her forehand and a red Dignics for her backhand.

Career 
In 2019, Liu Shiwen won the world championships. In a sit-down interview with CCTV, Liu discussed her 2019 World Championship run, placing a big emphasis on the psychological aspect. She noted that she felt like an underdog against both Ding Ning in the semi-finals and Chen Meng in the finals.

In 2020, Liu's season was cut short by the coronavirus pandemic. She did not return for ITTF's restart events at the end of the year due to injury. Liu was expected to return in 2021 at WTT Doha, but plans were cut short by China's decision to withdraw due to coronavirus concerns.

2021 
After getting surgery for an elbow injury that sidelined her through most of 2020, Liu began training with her teammates again in January.

In March, Liu participated in the Chinese National Team training camp and played in the China National Games Qualifying tournament, where she stated that she felt that she was fully recovered from her injury. National team coach Li Sun stated that Liu looked even better than expected in training camp, which prompted speculation that Liu was a front-runner to represent China in the singles event at the Tokyo Olympics. However, Liu lost 4–0 to Zhu Yuling in the quarter finals of the China Olympic Scrimmage in May.

In May, Liu was selected to represent China in the team event but not the singles event at the Tokyo Olympics. However, shortly after she lost 4–0 to He Zhuojia in the quarter-finals of the second leg of the China Olympic Scrimmage.

Liu played mixed doubles with Xu Xin at the Tokyo Olympics. In an interview in July, Liu stated that their doubles chemistry was better than ever before.

In July, Liu Shiwen and Xu Xin won silver in the mixed doubles event at the Tokyo Olympics being upset 4-3 by Japan's Mima Ito and Jun Mizutani despite initially leading 2–0. Following the loss, Liu withdrew from the team event and was replaced by Wang Manyu.

In September, Liu Shiwen reached the quarter-finals of the women's singles at the China National Games. After he round of 16 victory over Gu Yuting, Liu stated that the China National Games was her first real tournament in a year and a half. Liu defeated Gu Yuting to reach the semi-finals of the women's singles event, and won the mixed doubles gold medal with Xu Xin. Liu went on to win bronze in women's singles after losing to Sun Yingsha 4–0 in the semi-finals and defeating Chen Meng 3–1 in the bronze medal match.

Career records
Singles (as of 18 June 2019)
World Championships: Winner (2019), Runner-up (2013, 2015), SF (2009, 2011, 2017)
World Cup: Winner (2009, 2012, 2013, 2015, 2019), Runner-up (2017)
Asian Games: Winner (2014)
Asian Championships: Winner (2013), SF (2009, 2012, 2017), Runner-up (2019)
Asian Cup: Winner (2010, 2012, 2013, 2016), Runner-up (2009, 2015, 2017)
World Junior Championships: Runner-up (2004)
Asian Junior Championships: SF (2004)
Pro Tour Grand Finals:  Winner (3) London, England (2011), Hangzhou, China (2012), Dubai, UAE (2013).
Pro Tour / ITTF World Tour
Winner (14): 
2009: Danish Open, China (Suzhou) Open, China (Tianjin) Open
2010: Kuwait Open 2010
2011: Qatar Open 2011
2012: Hungary Open, Korea Open 
2013: Kuwait Open, Dubai Open
2015: Polish Open
2016: Qatar Open, Japan Open
2018: Qatar Open, Australia Open
Runner-up (16): 
2009: English Open
2010: Qatar Open
2011: Sweden Open, Austria Open
2012: Slovenia Open, China (Shanghai) Open, China (Suzhou) Open
2013: Qatar Open, China (Suzhou) Open, Russian Open
2014: China (Chengdu) Open, Sweden Open
2016: Korea Open, China (Chengdu) Open
2019: Qatar Open, Japan Open
ITTF Challenge:
Winner: Thailand Open (2018)

Doubles
World Championships: Winner (2015, 2017), Runner-up (2013), QF (2007, 2009)
Asian Games: Runner-up (2010, 2014)
Asian Championships: Winner (2005)
World Junior Championships: Winner (2004)
Asian Junior Championships: Winner (2004)
Pro Tour Grand Finals: Winner (2009)
Pro Tour /ITTF World Tour
Winner (20)
2008: Korea Open 2008
2009: Danish Open, China (Tianjin) Open
2010: Qatar Open
2011: China (Shenzhen) Open
2012: Hungary Open, Korea Open
2013: China (Changchun) Open, Russian Open
2014: Kuwait Open, China (Chengdu) Open, Sweden Open
2015: China (Chengdu) Open
2016: Kuwait Open, Qatar Open, Korea Open
2017: China
2018: Japan
2019: China Open, Japan Open
Runner-up (7)
2007: China (Nanjing) Open
2009: Qatar Open, China (Suzhou) Open
2010: Kuwait Open, China (Suzhou) Open
2016: Japan Open, China (Chengdu) Open

Mixed doubles

 Olympic Games: Runner-up (2020)
 World Championships: Winner (2019)
Asian Championships: Winner (2019), SF (2009)
World Junior Championships: Winner (2004)
ITTF World Tour:
Winner (3)
2018: Austria Open
2019: Hungary Open, Qatar Open, Sweden Open

Team
Olympics: Winner (2016)
World Championships: Winner (2012, 2014, 2016, 2018), Runner-up (2010)
World Team Cup: Winner (2009, 2010, 2013, 2015, 2018, 2019)
Asian Games: Winner (2010, 2014)
Asian Championships: Winner (2009, 2012, 2013, 2015); Second Runner-up (2005)
World Junior Championships: Winner (2004)
Asian Junior Championships: Winner (2004)

References

External links

バタフライ契約選手紹介

Living people
1991 births
Asian Games medalists in table tennis
Table tennis players from Liaoning
People from Fushun
Table tennis players at the 2010 Asian Games
Table tennis players at the 2014 Asian Games
Chinese female table tennis players
Asian Games gold medalists for China
Asian Games silver medalists for China
Olympic table tennis players of China
Table tennis players at the 2016 Summer Olympics
Table tennis players at the 2020 Summer Olympics
Olympic medalists in table tennis
2016 Olympic gold medalists for China
Medalists at the 2010 Asian Games
Medalists at the 2014 Asian Games
World Table Tennis Championships medalists
Medalists at the 2016 Summer Olympics
Medalists at the 2020 Summer Olympics
Olympic silver medalists for China